Karl Reinhardt may refer to:

 Karl Reinhardt (bobsleigh), German Olympic bobsledder
 Karl Reinhardt (philologist) (1886–1958)
 Karl Reinhardt (mathematician) (1895–1941), mathematician

See also
 Carl Reinhardt (1818–1877)
 Karl Reinhard (1761–1837)